The Zwentendorf Nuclear Power Plant was the first commercial nuclear plant for electric power generation built in Austria, of 3 nuclear plants originally envisioned. Construction of the plant at Zwentendorf, Austria was finished but the plant never entered service. The start-up of the Zwentendorf plant, as well as the construction of the other 2 plants, was prevented by a referendum on 5 November 1978, in which a narrow majority of 50.47% voted against the start-up.

Construction of the plant began in April 1972, as a boiling-water reactor rated at 692 megawatts electric power output. It was built by a joint venture of several Austrian electric power companies. The initial cost of the plant was around 5.2 billion Austrian schilling, approximately 1.4 billion Euro adjusted for inflation. The ventilation stack chimney of the plant is 110 metres tall. Since the plebiscite, the plant has been partially deconstructed. The Dürnrohr Power Station was built nearby as a replacement thermal power station.

Following the 1978 referendum, no commercial nuclear power plant (built for the purpose of producing electricity) ever went into operation in Austria. In 1978, Austria enacted a law prohibiting the construction and operation of fission reactors for electrical power generation, hence the plant nowadays is used for research purposes. Three small nuclear reactors for scientific purposes were built in the 1960s, and only one of these plants is still being operated.

Current use
The plant was purchased by Austrian energy company EVN Group in 2005; it is used as a security training centre and leased for filming, photography, and other events.

In association with the Technical University Vienna, a research center (the Photovoltaik-Forschungszentrum Zwentendorf) was founded at the site. The research center is equipped with a 190 kW photovoltaic system consisting of two modules with solar tracking assemblies.

The plant is used for operator training by Kraftwerksschule e.V. The current operator of the plant also allows visits to the complex.

Use in film
The Zwentendorf Nuclear Power Plant has been leased out over the years as a film location for films including Grand Central, Tag der Wahrheit, and Restrisiko

Gallery

See also

Anti-nuclear movement in Austria
Freda Meissner-Blau
Frieda Berryhill
Nuclear power phase-out

References

External links

Nuclear power plant Zwentendorf website
Virtual 3D tour through the plant, Foto360.at
React!Reactor! Martin Küchen at NPP - saxophone play in the power plant, 10th Oct 2013, YouTube video
 

Economy of Lower Austria
Nuclear power stations in Austria
Aus